The Parnell Commission, officially Special Commission on Parnellism and Crime, was a judicial inquiry in the late 1880s into allegations of crimes by Irish parliamentarian Charles Stewart Parnell which resulted in his vindication.

Background
On 6 May 1882 two leading members of the British Government in Ireland, Chief Secretary for Ireland Lord Frederick Cavendish and the Permanent Under-Secretary for Ireland T.H. Burke were stabbed to death in Phoenix Park, Dublin by the Irish National Invincibles (see Phoenix Park Murders).

In March 1887, The Times published a series of articles, "Parnellism and Crime", in which Home Rule League leaders were accused of being involved in murder and outrage during the land war. The Times produced a number of facsimile letters, allegedly bearing Parnell's signature and in one of the letters Parnell had excused and condoned the murder of T.H. Burke in the Phoenix Park.

In particular the newspaper had paid £1,780 for a letter supposedly written by Parnell to Patrick Egan, a Fenian activist, that included: "Though I regret the accident of Lord F Cavendish's death I cannot refuse to admit that Burke got no more than his deserts" and was signed "Yours very truly, Charles S. Parnell". On the day it was published (18 April 1887), Parnell described the letter in the House of Commons as "a villainous and barefaced forgery."

Also on 18 April the Perpetual Crimes Act had its second reading and debate in the Commons. It appeared to nationalists that it was more than coincidental that the Times article on the letter was published on the same day and was obviously intended to sway the debate.

The Commission
After considerable argument, the government eventually set up a Special Commission to investigate the charges made against Parnell and the Home Rule party. The commission sat for 128 days between September 1888 and November 1889. In February 1889, one of the witnesses, Richard Pigott, admitted to having forged the letters; he then fled to Madrid, where he shot himself. Parnell's name was fully cleared and The Times paid a large sum of money by way of compensation after Parnell brought a libel action. His principal lawyer was Charles Russell, who later become Lord Chief Justice. Russell also wrote an influential book about the case.

In an out-of-court settlement Parnell accepted £5,000 in damages. While this was less than the £100,000 he sought, the legal costs for The Times brought its overall costs to £200,000. When Parnell re-entered parliament after he was vindicated, he received a standing ovation from his fellow MPs.

The Commission did not limit itself to the forgeries, but also examined at length the surrounding circumstances, and in particular the violent aspects of the Land War and the Plan of Campaign. Testimony included an extensive submission by Land League founder Michael Davitt for which he was paid by The Irish Party. 
In July 1889, the Irish Nationalist MPs and their lawyers withdrew, satisfied with the main result. When it eventually published its 35 volumes of evidence it satisfied for the most part the pro- and anti-nationalist camps in Ireland:
 Nationalists were pleased that Parnell had been heroically vindicated, in particular against The Times which had become a supporter of the high Tory prime minister Lord Salisbury.
 Unionists conceded that Parnell was innocent, but pointed to a surrounding mass of sworn evidence that suggested that some of his MPs had condoned or advocated violence in such a way that murders were inevitable. They also made much of the fact that Pigott had formerly been a Nationalist supporter and was clearly deranged.

Historiography
A balanced and up-to-date overview of the "Parnellism and Crime" affair is given by T. W. Moody (1968), who was able to take advantage of the important modern contributions of Henry Harrison in the 1940s and 1950s and of Leon Ó Broin in the 1960s. Andrew Robert's biography of Salisbury (1999) mainly lists the government's concerns; chapter 27 covers the period from March 1887 to July 1891. The commission has a chapter in Myles Dungan's  Conspiracy: Irish Political Trials (2009). See also Jane Stanford, That Irishman: The Life and Times of John O'Connor Power, Part Four, "Taking a Stand".

References

Sources
Primary
 
 

Secondary
 Memoirs of Tim Healy, barrister and Nationalist MP; Chapter 23, "Collapse of Piggott 1888–89" / Chapter 24, "Parnell's Triumph"
 Charles Russell; "The Parnell Commission: The Opening Speech for the Defence Delivered" (Macmillan and Co., London 1889)
 Leon Ó Broin, Comhcheilg sa Chaisleán (Conspiracy in the Castle), Dublin, 1963 (later expanded and published in English)
 Henry Harrison, Parnell, Joseph Chamberlain and The Times, Belfast and Dublin, 1953
 T. W. Moody, "The Times versus Parnell and Co., 1887–90", Historical Studies (Papers read before the Irish Conference of Historians), VI, London, Routledge & Kegan Paul, 1968
 Sir Robert Anderson's 'Parnellism and Crime articles'

Citations

History of Ireland (1801–1923)
Public inquiries in Ireland
Political scandals in Ireland